Ball Pond is a census-designated place (CDP) in the town of New Fairfield, Fairfield County, Connecticut, United States. It is in the southwest part of the town, with the pond of the same name in the central part of the CDP. The community is bordered to the south by Taylor Corners and to the west by Putnam Lake in Putnam County, New York.

Ball Pond was first listed as a CDP prior to the 2020 census.

References 

Census-designated places in Fairfield County, Connecticut
Census-designated places in Connecticut